Fallin' Light is the third studio album and first Japanese-language studio album by South Korean girl group GFriend. It was released in Japan by King Records on November 13, 2019, as the group's second Japanese album. It peaked at number 7 on the Oricon Albums Chart. A music video was released for the lead single "Fallin' Light (Tenshi no Hashigo)".

Track listing

Charts

References

2019 albums
Japanese-language albums
GFriend albums
King Records (Japan) albums
Hybe Corporation albums